Pastra is a village and a community in the southeastern part of the island of Kefalonia, Greece.  It was the seat of the municipality of Eleios-Pronnoi. The community consists of the villages Pastra (population 133 in 2011) and Kremmydi (pop. 40). Pastra is 2 km northeast of Markopoulo, 3 km south of Agia Eirini, 5 km northwest of Skala, 6 km southwest of the port town of Poros and 25 km southeast of Argostoli.

Population

External links
GTP on Pastra

See also

List of settlements in Cephalonia

References

Populated places in Cephalonia